The Mapuá River is a river of Pará state in north-central Brazil. It is a left tributary of the Aramá River.

Course

The Mapuá River rises on the island of Marajó in the delta region where the Amazon and Tocantins rivers empty into the Atlantic Ocean.
It runs along the southern boundary of the Mapuá Extractive Reserve.
The Mapuá is a left tributary of the Aramã, which forms the northern boundary of the reserve.
The reserve contains sheets of tidal water and mangroves.
The reserve is mostly lowland floodplain, with some terra firma in the centre of the territory.

See also
List of rivers of Pará

References

Sources

Rivers of Pará